Giant Records was an independent record label, formed in 1987 under the Dutch East India Trading umbrella run by Steev Riccardo, based in Long Island, New York.  Giant was dedicated to punk rock groups, such as Dag Nasty and Uniform Choice .

Artists
Cabaret Voltaire
Dag Nasty
Government Issue
Indestructible Noise Command
Marginal Man
7 Seconds
Shonen Knife
The Slickee Boys
Uniform Choice
Verbal Assault

See also
 List of record labels

American independent record labels
Punk record labels